Twickenham railway station is in Twickenham in the London Borough of Richmond upon Thames, and is in Travelcard Zone 5. Only one main street abuts the station – at its west end – London Road running between a trunk road south of Twickenham Stadium and the town centre to the south including the town's public section of riverside.

The station and all trains serving it are operated by South Western Railway. Apart from Richmond Railway Bridge it is at the heart of a long section of two tracks at grade (i.e. the level of the surrounding land) between Putney and Egham. Between about this point and St Margarets station, 500 metres east, are three tracks instead of two. Adding to the station's use, west are returning ends of the Kingston and Hounslow Loop Lines. A street runs against the south side of the station meaning the westbound platform has long been in island format and doubles as the fast and semi-fast services' eastbound platform.

History
The predecessor, a neo-gothic station, was built by the London and Windsor Railway on the west of London Road bridge, opening on 22 August 1848. The station was originally called Twickenham Junction.

Preparatory work for rebuilding by the Southern Railway in its "Southern Odeon" style on the east of London Road was halted by the outbreak of World War II, with most trackwork and the vertical edgings of the five planned through platforms in place. After the war some platforms were made level for rugby spectators' trains which were hand-flagged through the station. On 28 March 1954, a completely rebuilt station came into use with three through tracks. The two main up platforms face each other. The slower of these sees more than half of services join from a flyover to the south which coupled with the three tracks to St Margarets ensures no hold-ups needed to fast services eastbound.

Platform 1 has not existed as a functioning entity since before 2003; platform 2 has had the conductor rails removed between 2003 and 2006. The trackbeds of both are now (2018) obstructed by temporary buildings.
Platform 3 (in 2018) has a direct access from the street available via a queuing area used during events at Twickenham Stadium.

On 4 February 1996, South West Trains ran the first re-privatised service nationally. This ran from Twickenham to London at 05:10. The last regular-scheduled privatised train on the main network was 48 years previously.

Services

The typical off-peak service from the station in trains per hour is:

 12 to London Waterloo, of which:
 8 run direct via Richmond and Clapham Junction with:
 2 calling at Richmond and Clapham Junction only,
 2 calling at Richmond, Putney, Clapham Junction and Vauxhall,
 4 calling at all stations
 2 run via the Kingston Loop and Wimbledon calling at all stations except Queenstown Road
 2 run via the Hounslow Loop line calling at all stations
 2 to Reading, calling at Feltham, Staines and then all stations.
 2 to Windsor and Eton Riverside, calling at Whitton, Feltham, Ashford, Staines and then all stations.
In addition to this, there are 2 trains per hour in the morning towards Shepperton, with 2 trains in the evening peak from Shepperton to London Waterloo.

Lines

Connections

The station is served by bus routes 267, 281, 681 and H22, connecting commuters to destinations such as Brentford, Hounslow and Hammersmith.

A taxi rank adjoins the booking hall.

Future

The RFU had petitioned the government to improve the station to be ready to handle the increased use during the 2015 Rugby World Cup. Network Rail invested in plans in partnership with Kier Property and new rolling stock was ordered. The partnership's boldest plans were countered by a residents action group. The Supreme Court refused leave to appeal from a series of pro-plan rulings in Summer 2013. The process led to reduced density and aesthetically enhanced plans and construction started in 2017. Enlargement of the complex to be mounted on a broad "podium", an outside street-level plaza, about 115 apartments, new retail units and a permanently open at-grade northern access point are being built in a programme of works forecast to end in 2020.

The works include two northern entrances with direct access and footbridge access respectively to platforms 2 and 3 (platform 1 as currently labelled is a siding); and a riverside walk beside the Crane, a large stream or small river linked to its associated Moor Mead park in Twickenham.

References

External links

Railway stations in the London Borough of Richmond upon Thames
Former London and South Western Railway stations
Railway stations in Great Britain opened in 1848
Railway stations in Great Britain closed in 1954
Railway stations opened by British Rail
Railway stations in Great Britain opened in 1954
Railway stations served by South Western Railway
Twickenham
1848 establishments in England
DfT Category C1 stations